Antonio Cortella (11 October 1896 – 20 May 1962) was an Argentine footballer. He played in 13 matches for the Argentina national football team from 1918 to 1922. He was also part of Argentina's squad for the 1919 South American Championship.

References

External links
 

1896 births
1962 deaths
Argentine footballers
Argentina international footballers
Place of birth missing
Association football midfielders
Defensores de Belgrano footballers
Boca Juniors footballers
Club Atlético Platense footballers